Gymnopilus junonius is a type of mushroom-forming fungus in the family Hymenogastraceae. Commonly known as the spectacular rustgill, this large orange mushroom is typically found growing on tree stumps, logs, or tree bases. Some subspecies of this mushroom contain the neurotoxic oligoisoprenoid gymnopilin.

Description
The flesh is yellow, the odor mild and taste bitter. The frail ring is dusted with rusty orange spores, and the gill attachment to the stem is adnate to sub-decurrent. It stains red with KOH and turns green when cooked. The spore print is rusty orange. Unlike psychoactive relatives in the Psilocybe genus, G. junonius lacks psilocybin and does not stain blue, but smaller specimens occasionally exhibit bruising. This mushroom usually grows in clusters from several to several dozen individuals, but sometimes grows solitary. It is inedible due to its bitter taste.

Similar species
This mushroom is often mistaken for Gymnopilus ventricosus, which also contains no psilocybin and G. luteus and G. subspectabilis, which do. It also resembles Armillaria mellea and Omphalotus olivascens.

Distribution and habitat
Gymnopilus junonius is found in Europe, Australasia and South America.  It grows in dense clusters on stumps and logs of hardwoods and conifers.  This mushroom is most common in moist, lowland wooded areas near rivers.

This species does not occur in North America; however some similar looking species do. These include Gymnopilus ventricosus on the west coast and G. luteus and G. subspectabilis in the midwest and east.

Biochemistry
This mushroom contains bis-noryangonin and hispidin, which are structurally related to alpha-pyrones found in kava. Neurotoxins known as oligoisoprenoids have also been found in this species.

See also

 List of Gymnopilus species

References

C.J. Alexopolous, Charles W. Mims, M. Blackwell  et al., Introductory Mycology, 4th ed. (John Wiley and Sons, Hoboken NJ, 2004)

External links

 Tom Volk's Fungi of the Month - Gymnopilus spectabilis
 Mushroom Expert - Gymnopilus junonius
  

junonius
Fungi described in 1821
Fungi of New Zealand
Fungi of Europe
Taxa named by Elias Magnus Fries
Inedible fungi